Mohiuddinnagar Assembly constituency is an assembly constituency in Samastipur district in the Indian state of Bihar.

Overview
As per Delimitation of Parliamentary and Assembly constituencies Order, 2008, No. 137 Mohiuddinnagar Assembly constituency is composed of the following: Mohiuddinnagar and Mohanpur community development blocks; Tara Dhamaun, Uttri Dhamaun, Dakshini Dhamaun, Inayatpur, Hettanpur, Rupauli, Chaksaho, Harpur Saidabad and Seora gram panchayats of Patori CD Block.

Mohiuddinnagar Assembly constituency is part of No. 22 Ujiarpur (Lok Sabha constituency).

Members of Legislative Assembly

Election results

2020

References

External links
 

Assembly constituencies of Bihar
Politics of Samastipur district